Coup de Torchon (also known as Clean Slate) is a 1981 French crime film directed by Bertrand Tavernier and adapted from Jim Thompson's 1964 novel Pop. 1280. The film changes the novel's setting from an American Southern town to a small town in French West Africa. The film had 2,199,309 admissions in France and was the 16th most attended film of the year. It received the Prix Méliès from the French Syndicate of Cinema Critics as the best French film of 1981.

Plot
In a little town in French West Africa in 1938, Lucien Cordier is the only policeman. Unable or unwilling to impose his authority, he is treated with scorn by everybody. His sexy wife Huguette has brought a lover, Nono, to live openly with them, claiming he is her brother. Cordier fancies the mischievous young bride Rose, but lets her brutal husband beat her in the street unchallenged. The head of the timber company, Vanderbrouck, daily insults him for all to see. And the bane of his life is a pair of slimy pimps, who flout the law and enjoy humiliating him.

It is the pimps that take him to the brink, so he gets on a train to consult his superior Chavasson, who tells him to act forcefully. On the train home is the attractive new teacher in town, Anne, to whom he warms immediately. Once back, he catches the two pimps alone and, after shooting both dead, throws the corpses in the river. When Chavasson learns of this, he rushes down to question Cordier, who says it was in effect Chavasson who killed them. Having outwitted his boss and removed his prime tormentors, Cordier starts on the others who have made his life a misery. Rose's husband, like the pimps, is shot dead and Vanderbrouck is dropped in a privy. When Rose’s husband’s servant brings his master's body back to the house, Cordier kills the servant as well.

Catching Nono peeping at Anne in the shower, he beats him up in the street. Then he steals the money which his wife had been saving up in order to leave him and goes off to see Rose. Huguette and Nono, reckoning that he is going to abscond with Rose and the money, storm round to Rose's and in self-defence Rose shoots both dead. Cordier gives her the money and tells her to get away fast. All he has left in life is Anne, to whom he confesses his general malaise and specific crimes. She is ready to accept him but he says he is now incapable of love. In the closing shot, he is alone under a tree caressing a revolver.

Cast

 Philippe Noiret as Lucien Cordier
 Isabelle Huppert as Rose
 Jean-Pierre Marielle as Le Peron and his brother
 Stéphane Audran as Huguette Cordier
 Eddy Mitchell as Nono
 Guy Marchand as Marcel Chavasson
 Irène Skobline as Anne, the teacher
 Michel Beaune as Vanderbrouck
 Jean Champion as Priest
 Victor Garrivier as Mercaillou
 Gérard Hernandez as Leonelli
 Abdoulaye Diop as Fête Nat
 Daniel Langlet as Paulo
 François Perrot as Colonel Tramichel
 Raymond Hermantier as Blind man
 Mamadou Dioumé as Mamadou
 Samba Mané as Vendredi

Reception

The film had 2,199,309 admissions in France and was the 16th most attended film of the year. It received the Prix Méliès from the French Syndicate of Cinema Critics and 10 César nominations but did not win any.

It received mixed reviews from U.S. and U.K. critics. The New York Times praised the performances and "the meticulousness and conviction on display here" but also added that the film "seems strangely lacking in overall momentum and direction." Roger Ebert called it "a cruel intellectual joke played on its characters" and said the film "left me cold, unmoved and uninvolved." Time Out said "this eccentric, darkly comic look at a series of bizarre murders is stylishly well-crafted, and thoroughly entertaining" and "embellished with black wit and an elegant visual sense." TV Guide called it a "stylish, twisted black comedy... with as dead-on an evocation of a torpid, seedy backwater as anyone has achieved on screen."

Awards and honors
French Syndicate of Cinema Critics (France)
Won: Best Film (tied with Garde à vue)
Academy Awards (USA)
Nominated: Best Foreign Language Film
César Awards (France)
Nominated: Best Actor – Leading Role (Philippe Noiret)
Nominated: Best Actor – Supporting Role (Jean-Pierre Marielle)
Nominated: Best Actor – Supporting Role (Eddy Mitchell)
Nominated: Best Actress – Leading Role (Isabelle Huppert)
Nominated: Best Actress – Supporting Role (Stéphane Audran)
Nominated: Best Director (Bertrand Tavernier)
Nominated: Best Editing (Armand Psenny)
Nominated: Best Film
Nominated: Best Production Design (Alexandre Trauner)
Nominated: Best Writing (Jean Aurenche and Bertrand Tavernier)

See also
 Isabelle Huppert on screen and stage
 List of submissions to the 55th Academy Awards for Best Foreign Language Film
 List of French submissions for the Academy Award for Best Foreign Language Film

References

External links

 
Coup de Torchon an essay by Michael Dare at the Criterion Collection

1981 films
1980s crime comedy-drama films
1980s satirical films
French crime comedy-drama films
1980s French-language films
French satirical films
Films based on American novels
Films directed by Bertrand Tavernier
Films scored by Philippe Sarde
Films set in 1938
Films set in Africa
Films set in the French colonial empire
Films shot in Senegal
Adultery in films
French films about revenge
Films based on Jim Thompson novels
Films with screenplays by Jean Aurenche
1980s French films
Foreign films set in the United States